Parablechnum ambiguum, synonym Blechnum ambiguum, is a species of fern in the family Blechnaceae. growing on wet rocks in eastern Australia, often seen near waterfalls. It is common around Sydney.

References

Blechnaceae
Flora of New South Wales
Flora of Queensland